Arthur Walcott (1857–1934) was a British actor of the silent era.

Selected filmography
The Mystery of a Hansom Cab (1915)
 The White Star (1915)
 A Gamble for Love (1917)
 Drink (1917)
 The Woman Wins (1918)
 The Wages of Sin (1918)
 Not Negotiable (1918)
 Under Suspicion (1919)
 When It Was Dark (1919)
 A Son of David (1920)
 The Scarlet Wooing (1920)
 Little Dorrit (1920)
 The Woman of the Iron Bracelets (1920)
 Unmarried (1920)
 Kissing Cup's Race (1920)
 A Sportsman's Wife (1921)
 The Amazing Partnership (1921)
 The Marriage Lines (1921)
 The Other Person (1921)
 The Loudwater Mystery (1921)
 Son of Kissing Cup (1922)
 Was She Justified? (1922)
 When Greek Meets Greek (1922)
 The Scarlet Lady (1922)
 The Uninvited Guest (1923)
 The Lady Owner (1923)
 Hornet's Nest (1923)
 In the Blood (1923)
 What Price Loving Cup? (1923)
 Beautiful Kitty (1923)
 Shadow of Egypt (1924)
 The Great Turf Mystery (1924)
 A Daughter of Love (1925)
 Somebody's Darling (1925)
 London Love (1926)

References

External links

1857 births
1934 deaths
English male film actors
English male silent film actors
20th-century English male actors